Tang Li (born 5 December 1965) is a Chinese nuclear weapon engineer who is vice president of Beijing Institute of Applied Physics and Computational Mathematics, and an academician of the Chinese Academy of Engineering.

Biography
Tang was born in Yixing County, Jiangsu, on 5 December 1965. His father  is an academician of the Chinese Academy of Engineering. In 1984, he enrolled at Beihang University, majoring in aerodynamics.

After graduating in 1988, he was despatched to Beijing Institute of Applied Physics and Computational Mathematics, where he was promoted to deputy chief engineer in February 2003 and vice president in December 2005.

Honours and awards
 2006 State Science and Technology Progress Award (First Class)
 2008 State Science and Technology Progress Award (First Class)
 2013 State Science and Technology Progress Award (First Class)
 2016 Science and Technology Progress Award of the Ho Leung Ho Lee Foundation
 27 November 2017 Member of the Chinese Academy of Engineering (CAE)

References

1965 births
Living people
People from Yixing
Engineers from Jiangsu
Beihang University alumni
Members of the Chinese Academy of Engineering